Prates is a Portuguese surname. Notable people with the name include:

 César Prates (born 1975), Brazilian football defender
 Cláudio Mendes Prates (born 1965), Brazilian football forward
 Jair Gonçalves Prates (born 1953), Brazilian football striker
 Jean Paul Prates (born 1968), Brazilian politician
 Luiz Carlos Prates (born 1943), Brazilian journalist, psychologist, and radio sport announcer

See also
 Prater (disambiguation)

Portuguese-language surnames